Events from the year 1595 in India.

Events
 The Scourge of Malice is built and launched, and will go on to be used in the first, second, third and tenth voyages of the East India Company under its later name of Red Dragon

Births
 July 5 Guru Hargobind, the sixth of the ten gurus of Sikhism is born in Punjab, (dies 1644)
Bihari Lal, poet is born in Gwalior (dies 1663).
Shri Guru Raghavendra Tirtharu is born in Bhuvanagiri,  India.

Deaths
 October 5 – Faizi, Malik-ush-Shu'ara (poet laureate) of Akbar's Court. (born 1547)

See also
 Timeline of Indian history

References